Esfanjan (also Romanized as Esfanjān) is a village in Sahand Rural District of the Central District of Osku County, East Azerbaijan province, Iran. At the 2006 National Census, its population was 3,660 in 1,060 households. The following census in 2011 counted 3,832 people in 1,206 households. The latest census in 2016 showed a population of 3,544 people in 1,168 households; it was the largest village in its rural district.

References 

Osku County

Populated places in East Azerbaijan Province

Populated places in Osku County